Noemi Mirkin from the University of Michigan, was awarded the status of Fellow in the American Physical Society, after they were nominated by their Forum on International Physics in 2007, for her leadership in establishing productive international collaborations, her many achievements in biological molecular physics and for her long service to the international community as an officer and Executive Committee member of the Forum on International Physics.

References 

Fellows of the American Physical Society
American Physical Society
American physicists
Living people
Date of death missing
University of Michigan faculty
Year of birth missing (living people)